Berthold Kobby Winkler Ackon (born March 3, 1990), popularly known as Wode Maya is a Ghanaian YouTube personality, vlogger, digital media influencer and aeronautical engineer. 'Wode Maya' means 'My Mother' in Chinese. In 2017, he took a video in a bus where seats were empty beside him and other passengers stood due to his skin colour and the video went viral. He is acclaimed to be one of the Top and Most Influential YouTubers in Africa.

Early life and education 
He hails from Ahekofi in Kofikrom the Western region of Ghana. He also attended the Beijing Language and Culture University(BLCU).

Career 
He was still a student when he started vlogging in China about his experiences and later quit his job as Aeronautical engineer. In December 2021, he started his own real estate company and said it will be known as 'CHARLIEMAG Estate' located in East Legon. He was one of six prominent YouTubers from around the world invited to cover the annual conference of the World Economic Forum in 2023. He was also invited to cover the 2023 Munich Security Conference.

Personal life 
He has a Kenyan wife called Miss Trudy who is also a YouTuber.

Philanthropy 
He donated about $10,000 for a dumpsite to be transformed into a park after he was inspired by a man in Kwahu. In 2021, he also helped to raise about $10,000 to cater for the educational needs of 100 children. He claimed it was more than a donation and called on others to take up such deeds.

References 

Living people
1990 births
Aeronautical engineers
Ghanaian engineers
Ghanaian YouTubers
YouTube vloggers